The Final Exit is a 2017 Indian Hindi supernatural horror film. It is directed by Dhwanil Mehta and produced by Vishal Rana & Mrunal Jhaveri. It stars Kunaal Roy Kapur, Archana Shastry, Elena Kazan, Reyhna Malhotra and Scarlett Wilson.

The film was released on 22 September 2017.

Cast 
 Kunaal Roy Kapur as Vidyut
 Archana Shastry
 Elena Kazan
 Reyhna Malhotra
 Scarlett Wilson
 Ananya Sengupta as Mysterious Women
 Divya Agarwal
 Mukesh Hariawala as Khurana

Plot 
It is the story of a guy who begins to hallucinate and is seeing things which are not for real. Things get worst when he tries to shoot those things through his camera.

Soundtrack

Critical reception

Reza Noorani of The Times of India gave the film a rating of 3 out of 5 saying that, "While the philosophical turn the film takes is interesting, it’s a tad too metaphysical. A different kind of horror, go for this one if you’re interested in a good dose of philosophy with your horror." Vishal Verma of Glamsham praised the concept, cinematography, background music by Shantanu Sudame and the acting performances of actors Kunaal Roy Kapur and debutant Ananya Sengupta and said that, "THE FINAL EXIT is a mind twister for the common audience and it requires an extra understanding of the other aspect of evil." The critic gave the film a rating of 3 out of 5.

See also

References

External links 
 
 
 

2010s supernatural horror films
2017 films
2017 horror films
Indian supernatural horror films
2010s Hindi-language films